Niels Rosing-Schow (born 1954, in Copenhagen) is a Danish composer. He was a student of Ib Nørholm.

References

Further reading

1954 births
Musicians from Copenhagen
Living people
Danish composers
Male composers